Nedašovce is a village and municipality in Bánovce nad Bebravou District in the Trenčín Region of north-western Slovakia.

History
In historical records the village was first mentioned in 1232.

Geography
The municipality lies at an altitude of 200 metres and covers an area of 6.914 km². It has a population of about 455 people.

References

External links
  Official page

Villages and municipalities in Bánovce nad Bebravou District